Creag Dhubh (756 m) is a mountain in the Grampian Mountains of Scotland. It is located in the Strathspey area of the central Highlands, above the village of Newtonmore.

Despite its modest height, Creag Dhubh is a true mountain and offers fantastic views from its summit. Its steep and craggy slopes make it difficult going though.

References

Marilyns of Scotland
Grahams
Mountains and hills of Highland (council area)